Achuta Manasa is an Indian Kuchipudi dancer.

Personal information

About
Manasa was born in Andhra Pradesh. She is the daughter of Rajya Lakshmi and Ravi Chandra.

Her official website was launched by Sri Sri Ravi Shankar.

Manasa is acknowledged as leading young exponent of Kuchipudi the classical dance form of India that has its cultural roots in ancient history.

Her dance journey began at age six under the guidance of Guru Smt Madhu Nirmala, who had taught some basic steps and later Guru Sri Narasayya. Her debut live performance was at the age of six. She continued her artistic endeavor under the tutelage of renowned gurus by Guru Sri Mahankali Suryanarayana Sarma for three years where a strong foundation has been laid. Later, she has been moulded as a complete Kuchipudi artiste and has been transformed as a gem of Kuchipudi by her Guru "Devaparijatham", "Raja Hamsa", "Natyavisarada" Sri Kaza Venkata Subrahmanyam, who is a disciple of the Gurus Dr. Vempati Chinna Satyam and Sri Chintha Adinarayana Sarma.

With over nineteen years of experience, Manasa has performed over 800 solo kuchipudi recitals at various locations in and across the country and has been honoured with many awards from several organizations, winning accolades and appreciation of audience and critics equally.

A graded artist of Dhoordharshan now, the Indian Ministry of Culture recognized the spark of excellence in the young ten-year-old then and supported her with scholarships to pursue her training for the next decade. Manasa was a 2011 member of the International Dance Council CID UNESCO and was invited to give a performance representing India for the 31st World Congress on Dance Research in Greece.

Education
Besides dance, Manasa is an engineer and worked for a software company, but resigned from the job to dedicate her time to Kuchipudi.

Performances

 Essence of Life at Taj Vivanta, Hyderabad
 Essence of Life at the Chowdiah Memorial Hall, Bangalore
 Performance of Temple Dance, Simhanandini, Kuwait
 2013 11th Ekamra dance festival, Bhubaneswar, Odisha
 2013 Hyderabad Heritage Festival, Chowmahalla Palace, Hyderabad, Andhra Pradesh
 Baisakhi Festival, Hyderabad
 2013 4th Laxman Garnaik Smruti-International dance and music festival, Antarjatika Nrutya Sangeet Samaroha, Cutuck, Odisha
 2012 performed as Sita in Sita Kalyanam, a Kuchipudi ballet, for the Tirumala Tirupati Devasthanams's Naadhaneerjanam, which was telecasted worldwide on the SVBC channel, Tirumala, Tirupati, Andhra Pradesh
 2012 invited to speak on sustainable development at IIIT and as a Kuchipudi danseuse at the Indian School of Business for the UXINDIA-International Conference on User Experience Design, Hyderabad, Andhra Pradesh
 2012 performed in "Prapancha Telugu Mahotsav World Telugu Festival: Kuchipudi solo recital", Andhra Pradesh
 2012 performed Kathak as part of "Kathak Nritya Vikas-2012" and was felicitated by Dada Saheb Phalke Award "Akkineni Nageswara Rao-Indian Famous Film actor" who recognized and blessed her as a "Wonderful Kathak performer"
 2011 performed Kathak as part of "Kathak Nritya Pravesh" and was felicitated by the senior cabinet minister of congress Sri Kasu Krishna Reddy and by Padmabhushan awardee Sri Potturi Venkateswara Rao along with many other personalities who praised Manasa that she performed with par excellence with stupendous grace, ease and agility
 Approved as a "Member of International Dance Council CID - UNESCO" for the year 2011 and was invited to give performance representing India for the 31st World Congress on Dance Research at Didimotiho, Greece

Awards
Manasa has received several awards including:

 Prathibha Puraskar by Acharya Nagarjuna University
 Natyamayuri
 Ugadhi Puraskaram
 Kala Sravanthi
 Sapthagiri Balapraveena
 Natya Kalamai
 Prathibha Pallavam
 NTR Memorial "Telugu Mahila Award" 
 international award "UNESCO Millennium Best Cultural Ambassador"

References

External links 

, her official website

Performance, interview videos
 Achutamanasa interview during Essence of Life Pressmeet in Hyderabad
 Achutamanasa in Essence of Life Press meet in Tajvivanta, Hyderabad
 Press meet of EOL team in Bangalore

Year of birth missing (living people)
20th-century births
Indian female classical dancers
Performers of Indian classical dance
Kuchipudi exponents
Living people
Dancers from Andhra Pradesh
Women artists from Andhra Pradesh